Özalp may refer to:

 Özalp, Van, a district of Van Province, Turkey
 Özalp (given name), a Turkish given name

People with the name
 Kâzım Özalp (1880–1968), Turkish military officer
 Özalp Babaoğlu, Turkish scientist